Sevier Valley Hospital is in Richfield, Utah, United States, offering healthcare to the rural communities of Sevier, Wayne and Piute counties.

The hospital is part of the Intermountain Healthcare system, and is accredited by the Joint Commission on Accreditation of Healthcare Organizations.

External links

Hospitals in Utah
Intermountain Health
Buildings and structures in Sevier County, Utah